Anne of Green Gables is a 1919 American silent comedy-drama film directed by William Desmond Taylor. The film was based upon the 1908 novel of the same name by Lucy Maud Montgomery. By 1999, all prints of the film were believed to have been lost.

Plot
As described in a film magazine, Anne Shirley (Minter), whose orphan career has been a lively one due to her natural mischievousness, is sent by mistake to the home of Marilla Cuthbert (Harris) and her brother Matthew (Burton). The brother and sister had decided to adopt a boy to help around their farm, but decide to keep Anne anyway. Her early youth is a series of misfortunes or "scrapes." During this time she meets Gilbert Blythe (Kelly) and their love for each other begins. When Anne has graduated from high school and is happily looking forward to college, Matthew dies and Marilla is struck blind. She takes a position in the village as a school teacher. Gilbert has taken up medicine during this time. Despite the ill luck that continues to follow her, Anne manages to save enough and pays for an operation that restores Marilla's vision. Then she and Gilbert are married.

Lucy Maud Montgomery hated the film because of what she called "absurdities." According to Montgomery, the flag of the United States was prominently displayed at Anne's graduation from her Canadian college. At another part, Anne encountered a skunk and mistook it for a kitten. However, skunks did not exist on Prince Edward Island at the time the film took place or came out, and only happened to be introduced by a farmer later. The film also contained a scene where Anne punished a child. Afterward, Anne brandished a shotgun to fend off an angry mob that congregated at her schoolhouse door on the child's behalf.

A summary of the film was published in the April 1920 issue of Moving Picture Aid, including four stills which have survived.

Cast
 Mary Miles Minter as Anne
 Paul Kelly as Gilbert Blythe
 Marcia Harris as Marilla Cuthbert
 Frederick Burton as Matthew Cuthbert
 Carolyn Lee as Mrs. Barry

Production notes

The film was shot in Dedham, Massachusetts from August to October 1919 and released on November 23, 1919.

Lucy Maud Montgomery, who wrote the original novel, was infuriated with the many liberties the film took with her characters, including changing Anne from a Canadian to an American. She wrote in her diary: "It was a pretty little play well photographed, but I think if I hadn't already known it was from my book, that I would never have recognized it. The landscape and folks were 'New England', never P.E. Island... A skunk and an American flag were introduced – both equally unknown in PE Island. I could have shrieked with rage over the latter. Such crass, blatant Yankeeism!"

References

External links

 
 
 

1919 films
1919 comedy-drama films
American silent feature films
Anne of Green Gables films
American black-and-white films
Films directed by William Desmond Taylor
Films shot in Dedham, Massachusetts
Lost American films
Paramount Pictures films
Films with screenplays by Frances Marion
1919 lost films
Lost comedy-drama films
1910s American films
Silent American comedy-drama films
1910s English-language films